The English Electric Canberra subtitled The History and Development of a Classic Jet is a book by British military historian and author Bruce Barrymore Halpenny about the English Electric Canberra. Illustrated throughout, the book includes interviews with Wing Commander K H Wallis, the man Halpenny attributes as having "saved the Canberra".

The book looks at the development of the aircraft during the early days of jet power and beyond. Each of the many marks and variants are described. The type's record of service with RAF Squadrons is given together with descriptions of the many experimental models.

In the introduction, the author states, “it was a matter of producing either a technical book, or one that would appeal to a wider readership, setting out the true Canberra story: marks, variants, overseas orders, squadrons, records, experimental Canberras, camouflage, markings, and most importantly, the truth about bombing up the aircraft; also serious problems with which the Canberra was sent out to operational R.A.F. stations." He chose the latter and the finished article is an "outstanding" tribute to a remarkable aeroplane, though those that were deep aviation fans were unhappy that it was not a technical book. A case that the author could not satisfy everyone.

The book took 18 years to complete and the acknowledgments cover two full pages - a testimony to the thoroughness of Halpenny's research. Among the many firms and names mentioned, one in particular comes in for special mention. W/Cdr. K H Wallis, who saved the life of the Canberra by inventing the system of loading bombs for as late at 1951 at R.A.F. Binbrook, not a single aircraft was capable of delivering bombs, simply because the fuselage was too low to the ground!

With Canberra's introduction came the early Rolls-Royce Axial Flow Avon engine, a full description of which, its history and development is given in Chapter 2 - the author even tells us how a jet engine delivers its thrust.

The book displays a collection of photographs - some never seen before, also the history and deployment of no less than 81 Squadrons each of which flies the Canberra in its various marks and roles.

References

History of aviation
Books about the Cold War
2005 non-fiction books
Aviation books
Air force history
Works by Bruce Barrymore Halpenny